Gul Abbass Khan (born 31 December 1973) is a Pakistani-born former cricketer. He is a right-handed batsman and leg spin bowler who played for Oxford University and Derbyshire in a two-year first-class career.

Khan was born in Gujrat, Pakistan. Having moved to England, he attended Ipswich School and Swansea University, and then did a one-year postgraduate course at Keble College, Oxford.

Khan played second XI cricket for Essex from 1991 to 1995. He played first-class and List A cricket for Oxford University and British Universities during the early part of the 1996 season and, according to Wisden Cricketers' Almanack, made a significant impact. "Gul Khan... revealed himself as a natural strokeplayer, and his arrival injected much adventure into the middle order. After several near-misses, he fashioned a maiden first-class century against Kent at Canterbury, which followed a brilliant 147 for the British Universities against Glamorgan in the Benson and Hedges Cup." He was awarded his Blue by appearing in the 1996 University Match against Cambridge University. At the end of the university season in mid-summer, he joined Derbyshire. During two seasons at Derbyshire, Khan played four County Championship matches and 22 List A matches.

References

External links

Gul Khan at the Cricket Derbyshire Foundation website

1973 births
English cricketers
Living people
Derbyshire cricketers
Oxford University cricketers
British Universities cricketers
Cricketers from Gujrat
Alumni of Keble College, Oxford
People educated at Ipswich School
Alumni of Swansea University